Deveören can refer to the following villages in Turkey:

 Deveören, Kıbrıscık
 Deveören, Savaştepe